Maria Paula Vargas (born 13 October 1995) is a Spanish female artistic gymnast and part of the national team.  

She participated at the 2015 World Artistic Gymnastics Championships in Glasgow,
and the 2012 Summer Olympics.

References

External links
https://database.fig-gymnastics.com/public/gymnasts/biography/12608/true?backUrl=%2Fpublic%2Fresults%2Fdisplay%2F5346%3FidAgeCategory%3D4%26idCategory%3D70%23anchor_60200
http://www.intlgymnast.com/index.php?option=com_content&view=article&id=3681:italian-women-best-french-in-mersin&catid=5:competition-reports&Itemid=221
http://gymnasticsnewsnetwork.com/world-championship-day-1-results/

1995 births
Living people
Spanish female artistic gymnasts
Place of birth missing (living people)
Gymnasts at the 2010 Summer Youth Olympics
Mediterranean Games silver medalists for Spain
Competitors at the 2013 Mediterranean Games
Mediterranean Games medalists in gymnastics
21st-century Spanish women